Heleodromia is a genus of flies in the family Empididae.

Species
H. angulata Wagner, 2003
H. ausobskyi Wagner, 1983
H. baculifera Tokarczyk & Kovalev, 1986
H. banatica Wagner, 1985
H. boreoalpina Saigusa, 1963
H. chillcotti Sinclair, 2012
H. cranehollwensis Cumming & Coovert, 2012
H. foveata Wagner, Hoffeins & Hoffeins, 2000
H. haenii Wagner, 1996
H. hilo Smith, 1965
H. immaculata Haliday, 1833
H. irwini Wagner, 1985
H. japonica Saigusa, 1963
H. macropyga Saigusa, 1963
H. minutiformis Saigusa, 1963
H. obscura (Brunetti, 1913)
H. oldenbergi Wagner, 1985
H. pectinulata (Strobl, 1898)
H. pullata (Melander, 1902)
H. rami Wagner, Leese & Panesar, 2004
H. saigusae Joost, 1991
H. schachti Wagner, 1985
H. starki Hoffeins, Hoffeins & Wagner, 1997
H. wagneri Niesiolowski, 1986
H. woodi Brooks, 2012

References

Empidoidea genera
Empididae